Confissões de Adolescente is a 2013 Brazilian comedy-drama film directed by Daniel Filho and Cris d'Amato, based on the diaries of Maria Mariana, which also led to theatrical performances, a book and TV series, the film follows the rites of passage experienced by four sisters.

Actresses Maria Mariana, Deborah Secco, Daniele Valente and Georgiana Góes, the protagonists of the homonymous TV series make appearances in the film.

Plot
After their father's warning that they will have to move out of the apartment where they live, in Barra da Tijuca, because of the excessive increase of rent, the girls promise to save more money and help in household chores to try to reverse the decision. While dealing with this, each one lives a typical rite of passage of the coming of age: the first kiss, the first sexual intercourse, first job, first breakup.

Living alone, but still with little money to support herself, Tina is in search of her first internship, while dealing with constant disappointments with her boyfriend, Lucas. Bianca is in a new relationship, and will soon be taking the vestibular exam, but have not chosen a profession yet, While trying to help a new classmate who suffer bullying, and she still has to deal with the jealousy of her best friend. Alice wants to have the first sexual intercourse with her boyfriend, also a virgin, but realizes the decision is not as simple as she expected. Youngest of four, Clara is addicted on Facebook and starts to target the interests of a friend from school, which resolves to behave as the vampire Edward Cullen, from the Twilight saga to conquer her.

Cast

Sophia Abrahão - Tina
Bella Camero - Bianca
Malu Rodrigues - Alice
Clara Tiezzi - Karina
Deborah Secco - Mother of Felipe
Maria Mariana - Dr. Kátia
Daniele Valente - Mother of Marcelo
Georgiana Góes - Selma, Coach of Physical Education
Cassio Gabus Mendes - Paulo
Olívia Torres - Juliana
Tammy Di Calafiori - Talita
Hugo Bonemer - Lucas
Christian Monassa - Marcelo
Guilherme Prates - Ricardo
João Fernandes - Felipe
Bruno Jablonski - Pedro
Anna Rita Cerqueira - Cris (young Tina)
Eduardo Melo - Lucas younger
Thiago Lacerda
Caio Castro
Gabriel Totoro
Cintia Rosa - Renata
Bruna Griphao - Bruna

Awards and nominations

References

External links
 

2013 films
2013 comedy-drama films
2010s coming-of-age comedy-drama films
2010s teen comedy-drama films
Brazilian comedy-drama films
Brazilian coming-of-age films
Films about sisters
Films set in Rio de Janeiro (city)
Films shot in Rio de Janeiro (city)
Juvenile sexuality in films
Films directed by Daniel Filho